Teji Harivansh Rai Srivastava Bachchan (née Tejwant Kaur Suri; 12 August 1914  21 December 2007) was an Indian social activist, the wife of Hindi poet Harivansh Rai Bachchan and mother of Bollywood actor Amitabh Bachchan.

Biography
Teji was Born into a Punjabi Sikh Khatri family in Lyallpur, Punjab Province, British India (present-day Faisalabad, Punjab, Pakistan). After completing her education, she took a job teaching psychology at Khoob Chand Degree College, Lahore. She met Harivansh Srivastava, then a lecturer of English at Allahabad University, when he attended a college event in Lahore. The couple got married in Allahabad in 1941, and upon her wedding, Teji became a home maker. She remained a lover of the stage, and she would also sing at social gatherings if pressed. During his lifetime, Harivansh remained completely engrossed in his work, leaving his wife to handle all family matters. Even in social engagements, the poet willingly played a minor role to his sociable wife. The Bachchans had two sons: Amitabh Bachchan and Ajitabh Bachchan.

The Bachchans were a part of India's literary circuit and high society. The couple sang at events.

Teji played Lady Macbeth in her husband's Hindi adaptation of Macbeth. They also played a cameo appearance in Yash Chopra's 1976 film, Kabhi Kabhie.

She was also appointed as one of the Directors of the Film Finance Corporation in 1973. The Film Finance Corporation of India (and its successor National Film Development Corporation of India), a Government of India undertaking's main objective was to finance the production of purposeful films of good quality with a view to improving the general standards of the medium.

Bachchan was in the Lilavati Hospital for almost the whole of the year 2007 and she was shifted to the ICU in November 2007 after her condition became worse. She died at the age of 93 on 21 December 2007 after prolonged illness.

References

1914 births
2007 deaths
Indian Sikhs
Indian human rights activists
People from Faisalabad
Punjabi people
Women Indian independence activists
Indian independence activists from Punjab (British India)
People from Mumbai
Indian independence activists from Maharashtra
Women in Maharashtra politics
Teji